The New York State Field Band Conference or NYSFBC is a local circuit for marching band competitions, based in the U.S. state of New York.  Championships are held at the JMA Wireless Dome in Syracuse, New York each year in the last week of October or first week of November. The conference was created in February 1972 to standardize rules and provide constructive feedback at competitions.

Mission

Purpose
The New York State Field Band Conference, Inc. was formed on Feb. 6, 1972 for the purpose of regulating and scheduling field band events in New York State, and for the enhancement of school field band competitions. It is the aim of the New York State Field Band Conference to encourage participation in such events.

Philosophy
It shall be the philosophy of the New York State Field Band Conference to encourage and provide the most positive experience possible for all participants. The Conference will address this need through procedures it implements regarding competition.

History
Eleven bands participated in the first championship in 1974 which was held at MacArthur Stadium in Syracuse, New York.  The conference has grown to over 50 bands in recent years and has seen participation from outside the state of New York with bands from Connecticut, New Jersey, and Pennsylvania.

The championship competition moved from various Syracuse area schools, as well as Cornell University in Ithaca, to the JMA Wireless Dome in 1980 and has been held in that venue ever since.

Classifications
The NYSFBC has gone through two major methods of classification for the bands that participate in sponsored competitions. The current system of classes was created in 1999, with the exception of the National Class, which was created in 1989.  This system consists of 2 major classifications (Large School and Small School) with smaller classes within each of the two major classes.

Past Winners

Old Classification System (1972-1998)

Current Classification System (1999-Present)

Band Championship Count 

* Won as Cicero HS, merged with North Syracuse HS in 1983 to become Cicero-North Syracuse HS.

** Won as Corning East HS, merged with Corning West HS in 2014  to become Corning-Painted Post HS.

Ties

1999-Present

1972-1998 

Note: Many of these classes from 1972-1998 changed titles often. I.E., A class in 1972 would eventually become National

References

External links
New York State Field Band Conference
NYSFBC Message Board

Music organizations based in the United States
Field Band Conference
Marching band competitions
Organizations established in 1972
High school marching bands from the United States